The men's marathon event at the 1987 Pan American Games was held in Indianapolis, United States on 9 August.

Results

References

Marathon
1987
Panamerican
1987 Panamerican
1987 Panamerican Games